Dongfeng is a town of Ejin Banner in western Inner Mongolia, China, located in the Gobi Desert near a cluster of dry lakes and  from the Jiuquan Satellite Launch Center. , it has 3 villages under its administration.

See also 
 List of township-level divisions of Inner Mongolia

References 

Township-level divisions of Inner Mongolia